Chus Cortina (born 14 October 1974) is a Mexican alpine skier. She competed in two events at the 1992 Winter Olympics.

References

1974 births
Living people
Mexican female alpine skiers
Olympic alpine skiers of Mexico
Alpine skiers at the 1992 Winter Olympics
Place of birth missing (living people)